Yuntiryak (Yöntiräk) is a rural locality (a village) in Takarlikovsky Selsoviet, Dyurtyulinsky District, Bashkortostan, Russia. In 2010, Yuntiryak had a population of 90. There are 3 streets.

Geography 
Yuntiryak is located 10 km northwest of Dyurtyuli (the district's administrative centre) by road. Kushulevo is the nearest rural locality.

References 

Rural localities in Dyurtyulinsky District